Epermenia is a genus of moths in the family Epermeniidae. The genus was first described by Jacob Hübner in 1825.

Species
Subgenus Calotripis Hübner, 1825

Epermenia aarviki Gaedike, 2013
Epermenia aequidentellus (Hofmann, 1867) (originally in Chauliodus)
Epermenia albapunctella Busck, 1908
Epermenia bicornis Gaedike, 2004
Epermenia boliviana Gaedike, 2010
Epermenia brasiliana Gaedike & Becker, 1989
Epermenia brevilineolata Gaedike, 2004
Epermenia bulbosa Krüger, 2004
Epermenia californica Gaedike, 1977
Epermenia canadensis Gaedike, 2008
Epermenia chaerophyllella Goeze
Epermenia cicutaella Kearfott, 1903
Epermenia conioptila Meyrick, 1921
Epermenia costomaculata Gaedike, 2013
Epermenia criticodes Meyrick, 1913
Epermenia dallastai Gaedike, 2013
Epermenia exilis Meyrick, 1897 (Australia)
Epermenia falcata Gaedike, 2008
Epermenia falciformis Haworth, 1828
Epermenia formosa Gaedike, 2013
Epermenia gaedikei Budashkin, 2003
Epermenia griveaudi Gaedike, 2004
Epermenia hamata Gaedike, 2013
Epermenia ijimai Kuroko & Gaedike, 2006
Epermenia illigerella (Hübner, 1813) (originally in Tinea)
Epermenia imperialella Busck, 1906
Epermenia infracta Braun, 1926
Epermenia insecurella Stainton, 1849 (originally in Elachista)
Epermenia insularis Gaedike, 1979
Epermenia karurucola Gaedike, 2013
Epermenia lomatii Gaedike, 1977
Epermenia maculata Gaedike, 2004
Epermenia malawica Gaedike, 2004
Epermenia meyi Gaedike, 2004
Epermenia minuta Gaedike, 2004
Epermenia muraseae Kuroko & Gaedike, 2006
Epermenia orientalis Geadike, 1966
Epermenia paramalawica Gaedike, 2013
Epermenia parastolidota Gaedike, 2010
Epermenia petrusella Heylaerts, 1889
Epermenia pimpinella Murtfeldt, 1900
Epermenia ruwenzorica Gaedike, 2013
Epermenia shimekii Kuroko & Gaedike, 2006
Epermenia sinjovi Gaedike, 1993
Epermenia stolidota (Meyrick, 1917) (originally in Acanthedra)
Epermenia strictellus (Wocke, 1867) (originally in Chauliodus)
Epermenia tasmanica Gaedike, 1968 (Australia: Tasmania)
Epermenia tenuipennella Gaedike, 2013
Epermenia turicola Gaedike, 2013
Epermenia uedai Kuroko & Gaedike, 2006
Subgenus Cataplectica Walsingham, 1894
Epermenia afghanistanella (Gaedike, 1971)
Epermenia devotella (Heyden, 1863)
Epermenia farreni (Walsingham, 1894)
Epermenia iniquella (Wocke, 1867) (originally in Chauliodus)
Epermenia kenyacola Gaedike, 2013
Epermenia mineti Gaedike, 2004
Epermenia nepalica Gaedike, 1996
Epermenia pulchokicola Gaedike, 2010
Epermenia sinica Gaedike, 1996
Epermenia sugisimai Kuroko & Gaedike, 2006
Epermenia theimeri Gaedike, 2001
Epermenia triacuta Gaedike, 2013
Epermenia vartianae (Gaedike, 1971)
Epermenia wockeella (Staudinger, 1880)
Subgenus Epermenia
Epermenia agassizi Gaedike, 2013
Epermenia dalianicola Gaedike, 2007
Epermenia ochreomaculella Millière, 1854
Epermenia pontificella (Hübner, 1796) (originally in Tinea)
Epermenia scurella (Stainton, 1851)
Subgenus Epermeniola Gaedike, 1968
Epermenia bicuspis Gaedike, 2010
Epermenia bidentata (Diakonoff, 1955) (originally in Ochromolopis)
Epermenia caledonica Gaedike, 1981
Epermenia commonella Gaedike, 1968 (Australia)
Epermenia davisi Gaedike, 2010
Epermenia ergastica Meyrick, 1917
Epermenia fuscomaculata Kuroko & Gaedike, 2006
Epermenia oculigera (Diakonoff, 1955) (originally in Ochromolopis)
Epermenia pseudofuscomaculata Kuroko & Gaedike, 2006
Epermenia thailandica Gaedike, 1987
Epermenia trifilata Meyrick, 1932
Epermenia trileucota Meyrick, 1921 (Australia)
Subgenus unknown
Epermenia anacantha Meyrick, 1917
Epermenia dracontias Meyrick, 1917
Epermenia ellochistis Meyrick, 1917
Epermenia epirrhicna Meyrick, 1938
Epermenia epispora Meyrick, 1897 (Australia)
Epermenia isolexa Meyrick, 1931
Epermenia leucomantis Meyrick, 1917
Epermenia macescens Meyrick, 1917
Epermenia oriplanta Bradley, 1965
Epermenia ozodes Meyrick, 1917
Epermenia parasitica Meyrick, 1930
Epermenia philocoma Meyrick, 1914
Epermenia philorites (Bradley, 1965)
Epermenia phorticopa Meyrick, 1921
Epermenia pithanopis Meyrick, 1921
Epermenia profugella (Stainton, 1856)
Epermenia septicodes Meyrick, 1917
Epermenia symmorias Meyrick, 1923
Epermenia xeranta Meyrick, 1917 (Australia)

Former species

Epermenia alameda Braun, 1923
Epermenia anthracoptila Meyrick, 1931
Epermenia asiatica Gaedike, 1979
Epermenia canicinctella (Clemens, 1863) (originally in Chauliodus)
Epermenia daucellus (Peyerimhoff, 1870) (originally in Chauliodus)
Epermenia dentosella Herrich-Schäffer, 1854
Epermenia fasciculellus (Stephens, 1834) (originally in Lophonotus)
Epermenia ithycentra Meyrick, 1926
Epermenia kroneella Rebel, 1903
Epermenia nigrostriatellus (Heylaerts, 1883) (originally in Chauliodus)
Epermenia notodoxa Gozmany, 1952
Epermenia ochrodesma Meyrick, 1913
Epermenia plumbeella Rebel, 1916
Epermenia praefumata Meyrick, 1911
Epermenia prohaskaella Schawerda, 1921
Epermenia proserga Meyrick, 1913
Epermenia schurellus Herrich-Schäffer, 1855
Epermenia strictelloides Gaedike, 1977
Epermenia sublimicola Meyrick, 1930
Epermenia testaceella (Hübner, 1813) (originally in Tinea)
Epermenia turatiella Costantini, 1923

References

  & , 2005: Faunistics of the Epermeniidae from the former USSR (Epermediidae). Nota lepidopterologica 28 (2): 123–138.
 , 1968: Revision der Epermeniidae Australiens und Ozeaniens (Lepidoptera: Epermeniidae). Pacific Insects 10 (3-4): 599–627.
 
 , 1979: Katalog der Epermeniidae der Welt (Lepidoptera). Beiträge zur Entomologie 39 (1): 271–288.
 , 2001: A new Epermenia Hübner, [1825], from Monte Baldo (Lepidoptera: Epermeniidae). Entomologische Zeitschrift 111 (8): 230–231.
 , 2006: New and poorly known Lepidoptera from the West Palaearctic (Tineidae, Acrolepiidae, Douglasiidae, Epermeniidae). Nota lepidopterologica 29 (3-4): 159–176.
 , 2010: New and poorly known Epermeniidae from the Neotropis, Australis, Orientalis and Palaearctic Regions (Lepidoptera). Beiträge zur Entomologie 60 (1): 57–70.
  2013: New or poorly known Epermeniidae of the Afrotropis (Lepidoptera, Epermenioidea).  Beiträge zur Entomologie 63 (1): 149–168.
 , 1989: New neotropical Epermeniidae (Lepidoptera). Beiträge zur Entomologie 39 (2): 227–236.
 , 2001: Contribution to the Lepidoptera fauna of the Madeira Islands. Part 2. Tineidae, Acrolepiidae, Epermeniidae. Beiträge zur Entomologie 51 (1): 161–213.
 , 2006: Epermeniidae of Japan (Lepidoptera: Epermenioidea), with descriptions of six new species. Transactions of the Lepidopterological Society of Japan 57(1): 49–69.

Epermeniidae
Moth genera
Taxa named by Jacob Hübner